100T may refer to:

Yamaha RS-100T, a motorcycle
Lotus 100T, a Formula One car
100 Thieves, an esports organization